Upsilon Ursae Majoris, Latinized from υ Ursae Majoris, is a binary star in the northern circumpolar constellation of Ursa Major. It is visible to the naked eye with an apparent visual magnitude of +3.79. Based upon an annual parallax shift of 13.24 mas, it is located roughly 246 light-years from the Sun.

The primary member of the system, component A, is an F-type subgiant star. It is a Delta Scuti variable with a period of 0.1327 day and an amplitude of 0.050 magnitude. With an estimated age of 1.168 billion years, it is spinning rapidly with a projected rotational velocity of 124.2 km/s and a rotation period of 1.2 days. The star has about 1.57 times the mass of the Sun and 2.79 times the Sun's radius. (De Rosa and colleagues give a mass estimate of 2.2 times the Sun's mass.) It is radiating around 29.5 times the solar luminosity from its outer atmosphere at an effective temperature of 7,211 K.

The companion, component B, is a magnitude +11.0 star. As of 2008, it has an angular separation of 11.78 arcseconds along a position angle of 295.4°. This corresponds to a projected separation of 419.8 AU. It has a mass around 40% that of the Sun.

Naming
With τ, h, φ, θ, e and f, it composed the Arabic asterism Sarīr Banāt al-Na'sh, the Throne of the daughters of Na'sh, and Al-Haud, the Pond. According to the catalogue of stars in the Technical Memorandum 33-507 - A Reduced Star Catalog Containing 537 Named Stars, Al-Haud were the title for seven stars : f as Alhaud I, τ as Alhaud II, e as Alhaud III, h as Alhaud IV, θ as Alhaud V, this star (υ) as Alhaud VI and φ as Alhaud VII .

References

F-type subgiants
Delta Scuti variables
Binary stars

Ursa Major (constellation)
Ursae Majoris, Upsilon
Durchmusterung objects
Ursae Majoris, 29
084999
048319
3888
Alhaud VI